Ouray County  is a county located in the U.S. state of Colorado. As of the 2020 census, the population was 4,874. The county seat is Ouray. Because of its rugged mountain topography, Ouray County is also known as the Switzerland of America.

History
Ouray County was formed out of San Juan County on 18 January 1877, the first county designated by the newly formed Colorado State Legislature. It was named for Chief Ouray, a distinguished Ute Indian chief. Ouray was designated county seat on 8 March 1877. On 19 February 1881, Dolores County was formed out of Ouray County.

On 27 February 1883, Ouray County was split into San Miguel County and what is currently Ouray County. The portion that became San Miguel County almost retained the name Ouray County when the Colorado General Assembly initially renamed Ouray County as Uncompaghre County. Four days later on 2 March 1883, the General Assembly changed its mind and changed the name of Uncompaghre County back to Ouray County.

The Ouray County Courthouse was constructed in Ouray in 1888 and is located on the National Register of Historic Places.

Mining operators in the San Juan mountain area of Colorado formed the San Juan District Mining Association (SJDMA) in 1903, as a direct result of a Western Federation of Miners proposal to the Telluride Mining Association for the eight-hour day, which had been approved in a referendum by 72 percent of Colorado voters. The new association consolidated the power of thirty-six mining properties in San Miguel, Ouray, and San Juan counties. The SJDMA refused to consider any reduction in hours or increase in wages, helping to provoke a bitter strike.

Geography
The highest mountain in Ouray County is Mount Sneffels at 14,150 feet above sea level. Many high peaks of more than 13,300 feet also exist. Other prominent features in Ouray County include Log Hill Mesa and Pleasant Valley.

Adjacent counties
Montrose County - north
Gunnison County - northeast
Hinsdale County - southeast
San Juan County - south
San Miguel County - southwest

Major Highways
  U.S. Highway 550
  State Highway 62

Demographics

As of the census of 2000, there were 3,742 people, 1,576 households, and 1,123 families residing in the county. The population density was 7 people per square mile (3/km2). There were 2,146 housing units at an average density of 4 per square mile (2/km2). The racial makeup of the county was 96.34% White, 0.08% Black or African American, 0.94% Native American, 0.35% Asian, 0.05% Pacific Islander, 0.53% from other races, and 1.71% from two or more races. 4.06% of the population were Hispanic or Latino of any race.

There were 1,576 households, out of which 28.60% had children under the age of 18 living with them, 61.40% were married couples living together, 6.50% had a female householder with no husband present, and 28.70% were non-families. 23.50% of all households were made up of individuals, and 5.50% had someone living alone who was 65 years of age or older. The average household size was 2.36 and the average family size was 2.77.

In the county, the population was spread out, with 22.50% under the age of 18, 4.10% from 18 to 24, 27.20% from 25 to 44, 34.10% from 45 to 64, and 12.20% who were 65 years of age or older. The median age was 43 years. For every 100 females there were 102.10 males. For every 100 females age 18 and over, there were 100.80 males.

The median income for a household in the county was $42,019, and the median income for a family was $49,776. Males had a median income of $35,141 versus $26,176 for females. The per capita income for the county was $24,335. About 6.00% of families and 7.20% of the population were below the poverty line, including 8.00% of those under age 18 and 2.90% of those age 65 or over.

Politics
In the first three elections that it participated in, from 1880 until 1888, Ouray County voted for Republican presidential candidates before voting for Populist James B. Weaver in 1892 and then voting for Democratic presidential candidates from 1896 to 1908. Then, from 1912 until 1944, Ouray County was a swing county that voted for the winner of each election from Woodrow Wilson's 1912 victory to Franklin Roosevelt's 1940 victory, however broke that streak when it voted for Thomas Dewey in 1944. Between 1944 and 2004, it transformed into a Republican stronghold, with Lyndon B. Johnson being the only Democrat to win the county in his 1964 landslide, with Republicans frequently getting 50-60% of the vote, even reaching more than 70% in Richard Nixon's and Ronald Reagan's 49 state landslides in 1972 and 1984. In fact, Nixon and Reagan are the only candidates in history to receive 70% of the vote in the county, and Reagan remains the last candidate in history to receive 70% of the votes there, and the second to last to receive over 60%, the last being George H. W. Bush in 1988. However, starting with Barack Obama's victory in 2008, Ouray County has transformed into a Democratic powerhouse, with Joe Biden winning it by almost 20 points in 2020. At 58.8%, Biden's vote share is the highest of any candidate since George H.W. Bush's 63.9% in 1988.

Recreation

Ouray County, named Switzerland of America, is home to many parks and hiking trails. The Ridgway State Park is located due north of Ridgway on the Ridgway Reservoir and includes a marina and camping facilities as well as an extensive trail system. Within and surrounding the county are the Uncompahgre National Forest, Mount Sneffels Wilderness, and the Uncompahgre Wilderness. Leading through the county is the Bear Creek National Recreation Trail. Well known for its view of the San Juan Mountains and Cimarron Range, scenic highways such as the Alpine Loop National Scenic Back Country Byway and San Juan Skyway National Scenic Byway exist. The Great Parks Bicycle Route and Western Express Bicycle Route also go through Ouray County.

The Elks Lodge of Ouray County is only one of a very few surviving American locations for a bowling alley facility - a more famous one being Milwaukee, Wisconsin's Holler House - that uses exclusively human-operated pinsetting units to set the tenpins for bowling on its pair of vintage wood bowling lanes.

Communities

Ouray County has two home rule municipalities, seven unincorporated communities. For statistical purposes, the United States Census Bureau has defined three of these as census-designated places (CDP). The home rule municipalities are the city of Ouray and town of Ridgway, also the most populous settlements in the county. Loghill Village is the next largest development. Along with Loghill, Portland and Colona serve as census-designated places within Ouray County. The other unincorporated communities within the county are Camp Bird, Dallas, Thistledown, and Eldredge. All the communities, with the exception of Ridgway and Ouray, serve as primarily residential communities, though Loghill Village maintains a small tourism sector.

Colona, Eldredge, and Dallas are located in the northern reaches of the county along U.S. Highway 550, though Eldredge and Dallas are located within the valleys of the San Juan Mountains while Colona is in the short stretch of the Uncompahgre Valley within Ouray County. Portland is placed down valley of Ouray, though still south of Ridgway. Camp Bird and Thistledown are communities placed southwest of Ouray on Camp Bird Road. From north to south the communities are Colona, Eldredge, Dallas, Ridgway, Ouray, and then southwest along Camp Bird Road to Thistledown and Camp Bird. The historic towns of Sneffels and Ironton are located further west from Camp Bird and south of Ouray, respectively. Populations listed below are from the 2010 United States census data.

Historic towns
Dallas
Guston
Ironton
Red Mountain Town
Sneffels

Minerals of Ouray County

See also

Outline of Colorado
Index of Colorado-related articles
Communities of Ouray County
National Register of Historic Places listings in Ouray County, Colorado

References

External links
Ouray County Government website
Ouray visitor's guide
Ouray County Historical Society
Colorado County Evolution by Don Stanwyck
Colorado Historical Society
Ouray County Plaindealer newspaper

 
Colorado counties
Colorado placenames of Native American origin
1877 establishments in Colorado
Populated places established in 1877